Kropacz (Kropáč or Niewiadomski II) is a Polish coat of arms and Czech coat of arms. It was used by several knight and szlachta (cs šlechtice) families in the times of the Kingdom of Poland, Kingdom of Bohemia and Duchies of Silesia.

History
6 June 1473 Wacław of Niewiadom was promoted to the lord of the Rybnik.

Blazon

In a field of blue morningstar on two morningstars.

Notable bearers

Notable bearers of this coat of arms include:
 Václav Kropáč z Nevědomí  - owner of Rybnik (1473–1494),
 Jan Kropáč z Nevědomí and his son Mikuláš Kropáč z Nevědomí - owner of Bučovice (1494–1512)
 Jindřich Kropáč z Nevědomí - owner of Ivanovice na Hané (1503–1513),
 Albert Kropáč z Nevědomí - owner of Ivanovice na Hané (1513–1527),
 Bohuš Kropáč z Nevědomí - owner of Ivanovice na Hané (1527–1539),
 Jan Kropáč z Nevědomí - owner of Hranice (Přerov District) (1533–1572).

See also 

 Polish heraldry
 Heraldry
 Coat of arms
 List of Polish nobility coats of arms

Sources 
 Jiří J. K. Nebeský, Kropáčovsko-Leskovský erbovní vývod (Hranice), Genealogické a heraldické listy 15, 1995, č. 1-2, s. 38-48
 Tadeusz Gajl Herby szlacheckie Rzeczypospolitej Obojga Narodów, Wydawnictwo L&L, Gdańsk 2003
  www.ivanovicenahane.cz
 www.uhrice-vy.cz<

Polish coats of arms
Czech coats of arms
Coats of arms with weapons